Harnett is an unincorporated community located along U.S. Route 401 in the southern part of Lillington Township in Harnett County, North Carolina, United States, situated between Lillington and Bunnlevel . It is a part of the Dunn micropolitan area, which is also a part of the greater Raleigh–Durham–Cary combined statistical area as defined by the United States Census Bureau.

References
 

Unincorporated communities in Harnett County, North Carolina
Unincorporated communities in North Carolina